Fresh Sounds From Middle America (vol 5) is the fifth and last album in the Lawrence, Kansas-based series of compilation albums. This volume was the first to be released on compact disc.

The "Fresh Sounds" series was organized by Bill Rich, of Talk Talk magazine, as a way to promote regional bands nationally.

Track listing
Across the Line - Homestead Grays (3:23)
I Was Only Joking - The Catherines (4:04)
Do As I Say - The Mahoots (3:31)
The Grand Design - The Backsliders (2:18)
You Wrecked the Party - The Wilmas (2:40)
In Our World - Ultraviolets (3:10)
Deviatus - Schloss Tegal (3:19)
Death Fiend Guerillas - W.M. Burroughs (11:00)
Red - Kill Whitey (3:55)
Away - Killing Drum (3:00)
Bright Lights - Joe Worker (3:20)
Eyes of Concern - Second Chance (4:00)
Escapee - Klusterfux (3:00)
Evening Whirl - Hayseeds (2:30)
My Best Friends - Kill Creek (4:36)
I Belong To You - 2-Mile Death Plunge (3:10)
Gray - Ultraman (2:28)
Drinking Hot Water - Car Family (2:25)

References

External links

National Library of Australia listing
Rate Your Music
Kill Creek

1990 compilation albums
Post-punk compilation albums
Record label compilation albums
Fresh Sounds Records albums